The Matthews-Dillon House is a historic house at 701 Skyline Drive in North Little Rock, Arkansas.  It is a -story brick building, with a steeply pitched gable roof in a saltbox profile.  The roof is continued over a small front porch, with flush-set chimneys to its left and a gabled projection to its right.  The house was built in 1928 by the Justin Matthews Company, to a design by company architect Frank Carmean.  The house is locally unusual for its evocation of colonial New England architectural style, executed as a brick variant of medieval English architecture.

The house was listed on the National Register of Historic Places in 1992.

See also
National Register of Historic Places listings in Pulaski County, Arkansas

References

Houses on the National Register of Historic Places in Arkansas
Houses completed in 1928
Houses in North Little Rock, Arkansas
1928 establishments in Arkansas